Lunovula is a genus of sea snails, marine gastropod mollusks in the subfamily Pediculariinae of the family Ovulidae, one of the families of cowry allies.

Species
Species within the genus Lunovula include:
Lunovula boucheti Lorenz, 2007
Lunovula cancellata Lorenz, 2007
Lunovula finleyi Rosenberg, 1990
 Lunovula serrata Lorenz & Bouchet, 2018
Lunovula superstes (Dolin, 1991)
Species brought into synonymy
 Lunovula venusta Tsuchida & Kurozumi, 1999: synonym of Lunovula superstes (Dolin, 1991)

References

 Rosenberg, G. (1990). Lunovula, a new genus of the Ovulidae (Prosobranchia: Gastropoda). Venus. 49: 189-197
 Lorenz F. & Fehse D. (2009) The living Ovulidae. A manual of the families of allied cowries: Ovulidae, Pediculariidae and Eocypraeidae. Hackenheim: Conchbooks.

Lunovula